The 1981 Avon Championships of Cincinnati was a women's tennis tournament played on indoor carpet courts at the Riverfront Coliseum in Cincinnati, Ohio in the United States that was part of the 1981 Avon Championships Circuit. It was the second edition of the tournament and was held from January 19 through January 25, 1981. First-seeded Martina Navratilova won the singles title and earned $30,000 first-prize money.

Finals

Singles
 Martina Navratilova defeated  Sylvia Hanika 6–2, 6–4
 It was Navratilova's first singles title of the year and the 46th of her career.

Doubles
 Kathy Jordan /  Anne Smith defeated  Martina Navratilova /  Pam Shriver 1–6, 6–3, 6–3

Prize money

References

External links
 International Tennis Federation (ITF) tournament edition details

Avon Championships of Cincinnati
Avon Championships of Cincinnati
1981 in sports in Ohio